The Ministerial Rd. Site, designated RI-781, is an prehistoric archaeological site in South Kingstown, Rhode Island.  It encompasses a prehistoric Native American settlement dating to the Late Archaic period, which extends along the banks of the Chipuxet River near Ministerial Road.

The site was added to the National Register of Historic Places in 1984.

See also
National Register of Historic Places listings in Washington County, Rhode Island

References

Archaeological sites on the National Register of Historic Places in Rhode Island
South Kingstown, Rhode Island
National Register of Historic Places in Washington County, Rhode Island